The Sigma SD15 is an updated version of Sigma SD14 DSLR produced by the Sigma Corporation of Japan and featuring the improved TRUE II image processing engine, but with the same image sensor as its predecessor. As such, the SD15 features the 4.7 MP Foveon X3 sensor. After having showcased the camera in photokina 2008 and officially introduced during PMA 2010, it finally began shipping in June 2010. It is Sigma's fourth DSLR since the SD9 from 2002.

There is some dispute over the 15.0 MP claim made by Sigma, resulting from the major differences between the industry standard Bayer sensor used in all other digital cameras, and the Foveon X3 full-color image sensor used almost exclusively in Sigma cameras. Since the Foveon sensor captures images via a three-layer red, green, blue silicone array similar to the three-layer technology used in Technicolor film, rather than the single-layer color interpolation method used by Bayer sensors, Sigma and Foveon count each RGB layer separately, so 4.7 MP times 3 translates to their 15.0 MP claims.

Differences with the SD14
While the SD15 retains the image sensor from its predecessor, it includes the improved TRUE II image processing engine that was already implemented in the Sigma DP2. Sigma claims that the new engine offers better quality with a faster processing speed while suppressing noise through a newly developed proprietary algorithm. The combination also offers a one-stop higher ISO range compared to the SD14, though the often desaturated rendition of natural green and oversaturation of blue has been retained.

The SD15 also features a larger, higher resolution LCD screen.
The SD15 also introduced Color Modes.
The storage medium was changed from a CF card to an SD card.

Software

Sigma Photo Pro 

Postprocessing of raw X3F and JPEG of all digital SIGMA cameras

Version 6.x  is free Download for Windows 7+ and Mac OS Version 10.7+  (6.3.x). Actual Versions are 6.5.4 (Win 7+) and 6.5.5 (MacOSX 10.9+).

References

SD15
Cameras introduced in 2010